Mei Lanfang Classics is a Peking opera production which is composed of six classics from Peking Opera master Mei Lanfang.  The performance is held in the Zheng Yici Peking Opera Theatre, an ancient theatre in Beijing. The director is Li Liuyi, and the art director is Mei Baojiu, the son of Mei Lanfang.

References

Peking opera
Mei Lanfang